HiFi Calypso is the second album by French writer, actor, filmmaker and singer Karl Zéro, backed by the Jamaican reggae band The Wailers.

Background

Karl Zéro's first album, Songs for Cabriolets y Otros Tipos de Vehiculos, was a collection of covers of international pop standards of the 1940s and 1950 (including "Perfidia" and "(I Love You) For Sentimental Reasons"). For his next album, he set his mind on recording calypso songs, and started looking for a reggae band. He then learned that Tyrone Downie, which was a member of Bob Marley and the Wailers, lived in Montpellier. It turned out that Downie used to watch Zéro's weekly TV show, Le Vrai Journal. He agreed to participate, and contacted other members of the band to recruit them to the project.

Zéro wanted to record the album at Tuff Gong, where Bob Marley recorded his music, but Bernard Lavilliers, who previously recorded there, alerted him to the rampant corruption he faced there. That dissuaded Zéro, who started searching for a studio "a little bit tropical", and settled on the Studio du Manoir, in the Southwesthern corner of France, which was used by Noir Désir, amongst other French artists.

Recording

The list of songs was selected by Zéro (who prepared a list of 25 songs, including obscure compositions) and the band, who wanted to perform the songs that they knew from their childhood, or that they played when they started performing. The final track list reflects both influences, which includes the French classic "Salade de Fruits" or the obscure Leslie Scott and Irene Williams song "Crazy Like Mad", amongst the calypso classics "Coconut Woman" and "Mama Look at Bubu", both made famous by Harry Belafonte.

Track listing

 "Rastaman Chant" contains excerpts from the historical collection "Afrique, une histoire sonore".

Personnel

The Wailers

Tyrone Downie – keyboards
Al Anderson – guitar
Family Man – bass
Glen Da Costa & Vin Gordon – horns

Additional musicians

Karl Zéro & Daisy D'Errata – vocals
Richacha – drums
Christophe Dutray – additional horns
Al Anderson, Alexandre Desplat, Daisy D'Errata, Glen Da Costa, Marie-Do & Kali, Tyrone Downie, Vin Gordon – backing vocals
Nelson Chambers – banjo on "Take Me Back To Jamaica"
Slim Pesin – additional guitars
Laurent Laisingué – steel drum
François Constantin – percussions

Production notes

Produced by Tyrone Downie
Recorded by Bruno De Jarnac, assisted by Yohan Rivernale at Studio Du Manoir
Additional recording by Olivier Gro at Twin Studio
Mixed by Bruno Jarnac, assisted by Nicolas Sacco at Twin Studio
Mastered by Geoff Pesche at the Townhouse
Artwork by Hrvoje Goluza

References

2004 albums
Karl Zéro albums
The Wailers Band albums